Circus Magic Clowns (서커스 매직 유량단) is the second studio album of the South Korean punk band Crying Nut. It was released in 1999 and is known for the title track Circus Magic Clown. The keyboard player Kim, In-Soo became an official member after the release of this album.

Track listing

Personnel 
 Park, Yoon-Sick  – vocal, guitar
 Lee, Sang-Myun  – guitar, vocal 
 Han, kyung-Rock  – bass, vocal
 Lee, Sang-Hyuk  – drums, vocal
 Kim, In-Soo  –  Accordion, keyboard, vocal

References

External links

1999 albums
Korean-language albums